Aspen Mountain is a mountain summit in the Elk Mountains range of the Rocky Mountains of North America. The north face of the mountain is the location of the Aspen Mountain ski area, one of four adjacent ski areas operated collectively as Aspen/Snowmass.

Mountain
Aspen Mountain is not particularly high, relative to other mountains in Colorado, but nonetheless looms over the town of Aspen because of the proximity of the town, which was founded as a silver mining camp in 1879 during the Colorado Silver Boom. The mountain flank was the site of intense mining activity in the late 1880s and early 1890s, with many remains of mining activity below and on the surface of the mountain. In the middle 20th century it became the site of recreational downhill skiing. In 1946, the newly formed Aspen Skiing Company, founded by Walter Paepcke, built the first chairlift to the top of the mountain and opened the ski area that bears the name of the mountain.  Nowadays, people use a modern gondola, which holds six people, to get to the top of the mountain.

Aspen Mountain is alternatively called Ajax by the locals.

See also

List of Colorado mountain ranges
List of Colorado mountain summits
List of Colorado fourteeners
List of Colorado 4000 meter prominent summits
List of the most prominent summits of Colorado
List of Colorado county high points

References

External links

Mountains of Colorado
Mountains of Pitkin County, Colorado
White River National Forest
Roaring Fork Valley
North American 3000 m summits